Chuck Norris vs Communism is a 2015 Romanian–British documentary film written and directed by Ilinca Călugăreanu. The film is about the illegal importation of American action and religious films on VHS cassettes to Romania in the late 1970s and 1980s, which the filmmakers believe contributed to the fall of the Nicolae Ceaușescu's communist dictatorship. The film recreates incidents and features interviews with Romanians such as film dubber Irina Margareta Nistor.

Cast
 Irina Margareta Nistor ... Herself (as Irina Nistor)
 Ana Maria Moldovan ... Irina Margareta Nistor
 Dan Chiorean ...  Teodor Zamfir

References

External links
 

2015 films
2015 documentary films
Chuck Norris
Documentary films about films
VHS
Romanian documentary films
Films shot in Romania
2010s Romanian-language films
British documentary films
2010s British films